Uragan-1 may refer to:

In military:
 Uragan-1, first generation Soviet automatic air defense interception system
 Uragan-1M, a variant of the BM-27 Uragan self-propelled multiple rocket launcher system designed in the Soviet Union

In science:
 Uragan-1, Ukrainian stellarator fusion experiment

See also
 Uragan (disambiguation)